The  is a compact station wagon manufactured by Honda exclusively for the Japanese market between 1996 and 2002. Based on the sixth generation Civic, it was introduced in February 1996 as what Honda called a "Sport Utility Wagon" and sold at Honda Primo dealerships. The name "orthia", a variation of the Greek word orithyia, comes from Artemis Orthia in Greek mythology.

The Orthia is available with either front-wheel drive or four-wheel drive configurations. It is powered with either 1,834 cc B18B DOHC inline-four or 1,972 cc B20B DOHC inline-four engines.

The following models were available at launch (with a choice of P (Primo) or V (Verno) equipment grades):
 1.8GX (available in front-wheel drive configuration with manual or automatic transmission options)
 2.0GX (available in front-wheel drive and four-wheel drive configurations with manual or automatic transmission options)
 2.0GX-S (available in four-wheel drive configuration with automatic transmission option)

In January 1998, an additional model, the 2.0GX-S Aero, was introduced.

A facelift in June 1999 saw only the 2.0 L engine option available and the models were B, M, S (available in automatic transmission option only), M4 and L4 (available in automatic transmission option only); the last two being the four-wheel drive versions. The production of Orthia ceased in January 2002 while its sibling, the Partner, continued until March 2006. The Orthia was replaced by the Airwave station wagon and Stream minivan.

Honda Partner (EY6/EY7/EY8/EY9; 1996–2006) 
A commercial van version of the Orthia, called  was introduced on March 15, 1996. It is powered with either 1,343 cc D13 inline-four, 1,493 cc D15 inline-four or 1,590 cc D16 inline-four engines. The 1.6 L engine-powered Partner was Honda's first Low Emission Vehicle. Anti-lock braking system was installed in January 1998 and the vehicle was brought into year 2000 emissions compliance along with a driver-side airbag as standard equipment.

Orthia
Station wagons
Compact cars
Front-wheel-drive vehicles
All-wheel-drive vehicles
Cars introduced in 1996
2000s cars